Mirela Roznoveanu (born 10 April 1947) is a literary critic, writer, and journalist who has published novels, literary criticism, essays, and poetry. She was a noted dissident journalist during the turbulent period of communist Romania's late eighties.

Roznoveanu was born in Tulcea. She holds an MA in Romance Languages from the University of Bucharest (1970), a master's degree in Library and Information Sciences from the Pratt Institute (1996), and a Certificate in Internet Technologies from New York University (1997).

She was fired in 1974 from the literary and cultural magazine "Tomis" in Constanța where she had been a senior columnist. In 1975 she moved to Bucharest. Between 1978 and 1989 she worked as a senior columnist for the cultural magazine "Magazin", published by the "România liberă" newspaper; in April 1989, during the process of the journalists from the "Bacanu Group", she had been investigated by the Securitate, moved and punished to work as a " health worker"; her books and writing were banned  (5. Grupul "România liberă" bulverseaza Securitatea si Sectia de presa a CC al PCR). She had been part of the dissident group of journalists who took over the "România liberă" newspaper from the hands of the Communist government on 23 December 1989, making it the first independent and anti-communist newspaper in Romania. She became a senior columnist, member in the board of directors, and a founder member of the "R" Company SRL.  http://blog.edituracartex.ro/?p=102 She had been also a founder member of Alianta Civica,the most important post-revolution pro-democracy group.

In 1991, she moved to the United States, where she has continued her writing career. She had been a librarian for the NYU School of Law (Associate Curator: International and Foreign Law Librarian, 1996–2013). From 2005-2015 she had been the Founder and the Editor of Globalex as Adjunct Associate Curator with the NYU Hauser Global Law School Program and the Honorary Editor (2015-). Globalex was awarded the American Society of International Law Jus Gentium Research Award on 13 May 2020.

In December 2000, Mirela Roznoveanu was honored by outgoing President of Romania Emil Constantinescu, for exceptional contributions from abroad in the service of Romanian culture and democracy. Mirela has been named an Officer of the National Order of Faithful Service. Her book The Civilization of the Novel: A History of Fiction Writing from Ramayana to Don Quixote received the 2008 Award of the Romanian Society of Comparative Literature and the 2008 Award of the Romanian Academy.http://www.hotnews.ro/stiri-cultura-8130507-premiile-academiei-romane-anul-2008.htm 
Read more on her personal web page https://wp.nyu.edu/mroznoveanu/

Interview: 
Mirela Roznoveanu's Four Decades of Professional Writing: A Dialog with Vladimir Wertsman for Multicultural Review https://archive.today/20130416134745/http://vetiver.weblog.ro/2011/11/29/mirela-roznoveanu%E2%80%99s-four-decades-of-professional-writing-a-dialog-with-vladimir-wertsman-for-multicultural-review/%23axzz1fzZVzDe0

She was rewarded in 2013 the AALL-FCIL SIS award.
She was rewarded in 2015 the Reynolds & Flores Publication Award.

Publications
 Modern Readings, essays, Bucharest, Cartea Românească Publishing House, 1978
 D.R.Popescu. Critical monograph, Bucharest, Albatros Publishing House, 1983
 Civilizatia Romanului (The Civilization of the Novel: A History of Fiction Writing from Ramayana to Don Quixote). An essay on comparative literature, Albatros Publishing House, vol.I −1983, Bucharest; Cartea Românească Publishing House vol. II – 1991, Bucharest
 Totdeauna Toamna (Always in the Autumn), novel, Bucharest, Cartea Românească Publishing House, 1988
 Viata pe Fuga (Life on the Run), novel, Bucharest, Sirius Publishing House, 1997; 
 Invatarea Lumii (Apprehending the World), poetry, Bucharest, Luceafărul Foundation Publishing House, 1998
 Platonia, novel, Bucharest, Cartea Românească Publishing House, 1999
 Timpul celor Alesi (The Time of the Chosen), novel, Bucharest, Univers Publishing House, 1999
 Toward a Cyberlegal Culture, essays, New York, Transnational Publishers 2001, 2002 second ed.
 Born again—in Exile, poetry, New York, iUniverse, 2004
 The Life Manager and Other Stories, novellas, New York, iUniverse, 2004
 The Poems and the Poet. A multimedia companion to Born Again – in Exile. Eastern Shore Productions, 2007;
 Elegies from New York City, New York, Koja Press, 2008
  Civilizatia Romanului (The Civilization of the Novel: A History of Fiction Writing from Ramayana to Don Quixote.) An essay on comparative literature,Cartex Publishing House,Bucharest 2008 (2nd edition)
 Old Romanian Fairy Tales. Xlibris 2012; 2nd revised edition 2013. 
 Life on the Run. A novel. Xlibris, 2018. Translation from the Romanian of Viata pe Fuga.
 A Magic Journey to Things Past. Memoir. Xlibris, 2019.
 Epic Stories. Xlibris, 2020.
 Vlachica: Mountaintops above a Stormy Sea of Contending Empires. Xlibris, 2021.

References

PROFESSIONAL MEMBERSHIP & ACTIVITIES:American Association of Law Libraries; American Society of International Law; Beta Phi Mu Honor Society – Chapter Theta; Member of the Romanian Writers Guild (1990–); Member of the Academy of American Poets.

References in Books
  Titu Popescu, (Germany), Mirela – un Paradox (Mirela Roznoveanu – monograph essay), Pop Verlag-Marineasa, 2005
  Mircea Zaciu, Marian Papahagi, Aurel Sasu, Dicționarul Scriitorilor Români, volumul 4: R – Z, Editura Albatros, București, 2002
  Aurel Sasu, Dicționarul Scriitorilor Români din Statele Unite și Canada, Editura Albatros, București, 2001
  Marian Popa (Germany), Istoria literaturii române de azi pe mâine, 2 vols, București, Fundația Luceafărul, 2001
  "Dicționarul General al Literaturii Române", Academia Română, 2004–2008.
  Gabriel Pleșea (US), Scriitori români la New York, Interviuri, București, Editura Vestala, 1998
  Who's Who in America
  Who's Who in American Law
  Who's Who of American Women
  Who's Who in the World
  Gale Encyclopedia of Multicultural America, 2014. 3rd edition, vol. 4, p. 25.

Living people
People from Tulcea
University of Bucharest alumni
Romanian emigrants to the United States
1947 births
Recipients of the National Order of Faithful Service